Press On Regardless (POR) is a road rally organized by the Detroit Region of the Sports Car Club of America.

The Press On Regardless was first run in 1949 as a Time-Speed-Distance rally. In 1969, the POR became a stage rally. In 1972, the event was part of the International Championship for Manufacturers and then in 1973 and 1974 part of the World Rally Championship.

In 1994, the Detroit Region SCCA dropped out of the organization of the stage rally, and reorganized the Press On Regardless as a brisk TSD rally. The Lake Superior Region SCCA  currently runs the Lake Superior Performance Rally (LSPR) over many of the old POR roads in the Upper Peninsula of Michigan. LSPR is part of the American Rally Association schedule.

Press On Regardless is a registered trademark  of the Sports Car Club of America.

Winners

References

Rally competitions in the United States
Motorsport in Michigan
World Rally Championship rallies
Recurring sporting events established in 1949